Rahel Repkin (born 17 June 1998) is an Estonian footballer who plays as a midfielder for Tammeka and the Estonia women's national team.

Career
She made her debut for the Estonia national team on 23 October 2020 against the Netherlands, coming on as a substitute for Kristiina Tullus.

References

External links

1998 births
Living people
Women's association football midfielders
Estonian women's footballers
Estonia women's international footballers
Sportspeople from Tartu
Tartu JK Tammeka (women) players